Aleksandr Mikhailovich Gerasimov (12 August 1881 – 23 July 1963) was a Soviet and Russian painter. He was a leading proponent of socialist realism in the visual arts, and painted Joseph Stalin and other Soviet leaders.

Biography 
Gerasimov was born on 12 August 1881 in Kozlov (now Michurinsk) in Tambov Governorate, Russian Empire. He studied at the Moscow School of Painting, Sculpture and Architecture from 1903 to 1915. There he championed traditional realistic representational art against the avant-garde.

During World War I and the Russian Civil War he served in the army. Subsequently he returned to his hometown to become a stage designer, helping to present plays glorifying the Revolution and the Soviet government.

In 1925, Gerasimov returned to Moscow and set up a studio, combining techniques of academic realism with an Impressionistic light touch. He favored a style known as heroic realism, which featured images of revolutionary leaders such as Vladimir Lenin as larger-than-life heroes. As Stalin tightened his grip on the country, Gerasimov concentrated on official portraits, such as Stalin and Voroshilov in the Kremlin, for which he won a Stalin Prize in 1941. He produced a large number of heroic portraits of Kliment Voroshilov, to the point that Nikita Khrushchev would later accuse Voroshilov of having spent most of his time in Gerasimov's studio, to the detriment of his responsibilities as People's Commissar of Defense.

Gerasimov's leadership of the Union of Artists of the USSR (replacing his nemesis and ironic namesake Sergey Vasilyevich Gerasimov) and the Soviet Academy of Arts was criticized as heavy-handed. He was at the forefront of the attacks against cosmopolitanism and formalism during the Zhdanovshchina.

Although his flattering portraits of Soviet leaders and his political activities against artists who would not toe his line have gained him a reputation as a political hack, Gerasimov remained a genuine artist. Even at the end of his career, he continued to follow a moody, almost Impressionistic treatment of landscapes, at odds with the conventional nature of his official portraiture.

Selected paintings

References

External links 
 Public artist USSR A.M.GERASIMOV
 Public artist USSR A.M.GERASIMOV Museum-Estate
 

1881 births
1963 deaths
People from Michurinsk
People from Kozlovsky Uyezd
Communist Party of the Soviet Union members
Members of the Supreme Soviet of the Russian Soviet Federative Socialist Republic, 1947–1951
Members of the Supreme Soviet of the Russian Soviet Federative Socialist Republic, 1951–1955
Members of the Supreme Soviet of the Russian Soviet Federative Socialist Republic, 1955–1959
Soviet painters
Russian male painters
Socialist realist artists
20th-century Russian painters
Full Members of the USSR Academy of Arts
Russian military personnel of World War I
People's Artists of the USSR (visual arts)
Stalin Prize winners
Recipients of the Order of Lenin
Recipients of the Order of the Red Banner of Labour
Burials at Novodevichy Cemetery
Moscow School of Painting, Sculpture and Architecture alumni